Piney Branch is a tributary of Rock Creek in Washington, D.C. It is the largest tributary located entirely within the Washington city limits.

Course
Located in the Northwest quadrant of Washington, D.C., the stream flows next to Piney Branch Parkway and empties into Rock Creek near the intersection of the parkway and Beach Drive, inside Rock Creek Park. Rock Creek drains to the Potomac River, which empties into the Chesapeake Bay.

It is the largest tributary located entirely within the Washington city limits.

Watershed and water quality
Its surface stream drainage is augmented by four combined sewer systems that discharge into it. About five percent of the watershed consists of forested parkland near its surface stream. The rest of the area is mainly residential, with some light industrial zones. The creek is listed as polluted by 10 chemicals and four metals: lead, copper, zinc, and arsenic. It is spanned by the 16th Street Bridge, the country's first parabolic arch bridge.

History
In prehistoric times, the creek's valley was a source of quartzite cobbles for toolmaking. One quarry site is located at the bluffs overlooking Piney Branch from the north, about 30 feet below the summit of a southeast-facing hill. Dubbed the "Piney Branch Quarry Site", it was first examined by archeologist William Henry Holmes in 1889 and 1890. Another investigation begin in 2006 revealed quartzite debitage, whole and broken turtleback “preforms,” and half of a large ax.

In the mid-1800s, the creek's valley was the location of the first road through the area that would become Rock Creek Park. Called Piney Branch Road or 14th Street Road, the narrow country way went north from the Mount Pleasant neighborhood down into the valley, across a rickety bridge just west of today's 16th Street Bridge, then climbed up to the present-day neighborhood of Crestwood.

Funding to build the Piney Branch Parkway, which runs along the creek for most of its length, was "authorized in 1907, but not built until the mid-1930s when funding and workers became available through the New Deal."

In 2014, the District of Columbia Water and Sewer Authority began design work on the Piney Branch Trunk Sewer Rehabilitation Project, a series of repairs and improvements to the combined sewer system that discharges into the creek. Composed of 8- to 10-foot brick and concrete pipes, the Piney Branch Trunk Sewer is one of the city's major trunk sewers. Project design was slated to start in January 2014 and last one year. As of early 2016, work was to begin in 2017 and last until 2019.

See also
List of rivers of Washington, D.C.

References

External links

 Piney Branch watershed photos
 2009 map of the combined sewer that empties into Piney Branch

Rock Creek (Potomac River tributary)
Rock Creek Park
Rivers of Washington, D.C.